Deh Asiab may refer to:
 Deh Asiab, Sahneh
 Deh Asiab, Sonqor